Mae Salong Nai is a tambon (subdistrict) of Mae Fa Luang District, in Chiang Rai Province, Thailand. In 2015 it had a population of 25,539 people.

History
The subdistrict was created effective 29 May 1991 by splitting off seven administrative villages from Pa Sang and Si Kham.

Administration

Central administration
The tambon is divided into 27 administrative villages (mubans).

Local administration
The area of the subdistrict is covered by the subdistrict administrative organization (SAO) Mae Salong Nai (องค์การบริหารส่วนตำบลแม่สลองใน).

References

External links
Thaitambon.com on Mae Salong Nai 

Tambon of Chiang Rai province
Populated places in Chiang Rai province